Asemeia is a genus of snout moths. It was described by George Hampson in 1930 and contains the species Asemeia aprepia. It is found in Sri Lanka.

References

Phycitinae
Monotypic moth genera
Moths of Asia